Mursko Središće (Kajkavian: Mursko Središče) is the northernmost town in Croatia, located at  (alt. 175 m) and one of the oldest localities in Međimurje County.

It lies on the river Mura, the natural line dividing Croatia from Slovenia.

Nearby places are Čakovec, Sveti Martin na Muri, Lendava, and Podturen.

History

Mursko Središće is first mentioned in 1334 as Sancti Martini in Zredysche. Historian Ivan Kukuljević-Sakcinski claimed that the site was occupied by the Romans and was known under the name of Helicanum. If true, it would have been a strategic point on the road between Ptuj (Poetovio) in Slovenia and Carnuntum (Petronell) on the river Danube, the post between today's Vienna and Bratislava in Slovakia. The existing road was built in the 1st century. Other historians disagree, claiming that Helicanum might be today's Sveti Martin na Muri or nearby Lendava (Lendva).

The town's residents have always been connected to their river. Since the 4th century BC, there have been reports of  floating mills powered by the river's stream. The ancient know-how was later accepted by Slavs, then by Magyars upon their arrival. Several decades ago, many of them were scattered along the river banks. The last one in the town was still operating in the 1970s.

In 1477, Mursko Središće was officially mentioned as an important trade post with three other places in Međimurje (Čakovec, Prelog and Nedelišće). In 1650, the town was known as Muraszerdahely and in 1660 the local chapel of St. Martin was documented. In 1716 the church, that of St. Ladislaus, was built in the gothic style, but was ruined by the flood in 1690. It was then rebuilt in late baroque style.

The town was the seat of Muraszerdahely District of the former Zala County.

The building of a railroad between Lendava and Čakovec in 1889 facilitated communication, and the first bridge crossing the Mura river was built for the railroad in 1889.

With the beginning of the 20th century, development was faster thanks to the discovery of crude oil in nearby Selnica and Peklenica in 1856. At the time, oil was treated and used differently, with total production of 6900 t in 1918. In 1901, even for that level of extraction a pipeline was constructed between Mursko Središće and nearby Selnica, the first one in this part of Europe.

In late 1918, Mursko Središće was added to the Kingdom of Serbs, Croats and Slovenes with the rest of Međimurje. During the World War II, between 1941 and 1945, it was occupied by Hungary.

After World War I, coal was discovered in 1921, and the exploitation of this source of energy began soon after. The first coal mine was opened in 1926, with qualified and experienced workers brought from Slovenia. (There were other points of extraction in Peklenica (even earlier) and Lopatinec. World War II ended the business started by Kraljić & Majhen Co., which was then nationalized and managed under the name of Međimurski ugljenokopi. In that period (1946–1972), coal extraction was significant, with total output of 4,593,961 t, in average 155,000 t each year. Low prices of gasoline made the coal extraction industry unprofitable and forced it to be closed despite significant reserves.

The second bridge over the Mura, used in road transportation, was built in 1968.

Population

The town's administrative area consists of the following settlements:
 Hlapičina, population 676
 Križovec, population 631
 Mursko Središće, population 3,444
 Peklenica, population 1,217
 Štrukovec, population 339

People and activities

The local elementary school has about 500 pupils. Since the whole area was for centuries influenced by or was part of Hungary, part of its history and culture are still evident today in language, diet, customs, and music.

Forms of organized activities are numerous, such as tennis, basketball, association football, chess, hunting and fishing, and the radio "9A1CMS" club.

There are two singing choirs, one of them adding literary, drama, music tamburitza music and folklore sections, the last run by Franjo Liklin for decades. Portions of the work by renowned ethnomusicologist Vinko Žganec was done here since he was the native of neighboring Vratišinec.

Today

Today, Mursko Središće is the local administrative, business and trade center with industry primarily in the textile, transportation, building materials and more and more tourism. There are numerous places to stay within the town or in proximity to it.

References

External links
 Mursko Središće

Cities and towns in Croatia
Populated places in Međimurje County